Soheila Fors (born 8 February 1967) is an Iranian-Swedish women's rights activist, writer and founder of the Khatoon-foundation for immigrant women.

Biography 
Fors was born in Gilan-e Gharb in Kermanshah, and after having joined the resistance against Ayatollah Khomeini following the regime's persecution of her family, she moved to Sweden in 1993 with her husband and two children. As the relationship became increasingly more abusive, she divorced her husband, and eventually married her current husband in 1998, with whom she has two children. Driven by her own experience, Fors established shelters for women to break out of isolation and abuse, focusing particularly on immigrant women suffering under honour culture. She has also been active in collecting relief aid to refugees in Kurdistan.

Due to her activism, she has received death threats from people claiming to represent the Islamic State of Iraq and the Levant (ISIL).

Fors was chosen as "Rolemodel of the year" by Christian newspaper Dagen in 2012. Her biography, Kärleken blev mitt vapen, was released in 2015. She is a Christian.

Published books
2015: Kärleken blev mitt vapen. Libris. .
2016: Bakom varje fönster bor ett hjärta. Libris. .

References

1967 births
Living people
Iranian Kurdish women
Iranian refugees
Refugees in Sweden
Swedish women's rights activists
Swedish Christians
Swedish writers
Swedish women writers
Iranian emigrants to Sweden